The Bishop of Selby is an episcopal title used by a suffragan bishop of the Church of England Diocese of York, in the Province of York, England. The title refers to the town of Selby in North Yorkshire; the See was erected under the Suffragans Nomination Act 1888 by Order in Council dated 20 December 1938. The Bishop of Selby has episcopal oversight of the Archdeaconry of York.

On 3 July 2014, John Thomson was consecrated Bishop suffragan of Selby at York Minster.

List of bishops

References

External links
 Crockford's Clerical Directory - Listings

 
Anglican suffragan bishops in the Diocese of York